"You're So Fine" is the title of a popular song performed by The Falcons.

Background
The song was released as a single in 1959 and reached number seventeen on the US Billboard chart.

Chart history

Covers
 Johnny Burnette's 1961 album Johnny Burnett featured the song.
 The song was recorded by Boz Scaggs for his 1965 album Boz.
 Wilson Pickett, who joined The Falcons a year after they recorded the song, used it as the B-side to his single version of "Land of a 1000 Dances", recorded in May 1966.  His version was backed by the Muscle Shoals Rhythm Section.
 Ike and Tina Turner included the song on the 1966 album River Deep - Mountain High, although the song was likely recorded prior to that year.
  A live version of the song was included as a bonus track on a rerelease of Grinderswitch's 1974 album Honest To Goodness.
 Tony Orlando used the song on his 1978 album Tony Orlando.
 Rita Coolidge covered the song on her 1978 album Love Me Again.

References

1959 singles
1959 songs